Michael Brooks Burgess (November 19, 1975) is a former Republican member of the Kansas House of Representatives, representing the 51st district.  He has served from 2003 to 2013.

Burgess, who works as a web developer, has a BA in Journalism/Mass Communication from Kansas State University.

He is a board member of the Shawnee County Fair Association and past chair of the Public Relations Society of America Technology Section.

Committee and caucus membership
 Energy and Utilities
 Transportation
 Government Efficiency and Fiscal Oversight (Vice-Chair)
 Joint Committee on Information Technology
 Congressional Motorcycle Safety Caucus

Major donors
The top 5 donors to Burgess' 2008 campaign are mostly professional organizations:
1. Kansas Contractors Assoc 	$1,000 	
2. AT&T 	$500 	
3. Kansas Medical Society 	$500 	
4. Northeast Kansas Building & Construction Trades Council 	$500
5. Lewis, John G 	$500

References

External links
Official Website
Mike Burgess's Official Website
Kansas Legislature 2011-2012 - Mike Burgess
Project Vote Smart profile
Kansas Votes profile
State Surge - Legislative and voting track record
 Follow the Money campaign contributions:
 1998,2002, 2004, 2006, 2008
Ballotpedia
Mike Burgess on Facebook
Mike Burgess on Twitter

1975 births
Living people
Republican Party members of the Kansas House of Representatives
Kansas State University alumni
People from Wamego, Kansas
Politicians from Topeka, Kansas
21st-century American politicians